This list covers the characters from SSSS.Gridman and SSSS.Dynazenon by Studio Trigger in the Gridman Universe, a fictional world created by Tsuburaya Productions.

SSSS.Gridman

Gridman Alliance
 is a trio of high school students who assisted the Hyper Agent Gridman in fighting Kaiju attacks within the city. Due to their connection with the hero, they were the only ones who are not affected by the changes made when one of Akane's Kaiju killed a victim, causing them to be erased from existence. Their base of operations is Junk Shop Aya, Rikka's shophouse.

A  who attempted to defeat Alexis Kerib, only to be defeated and fragmented into parts with one inhabiting the body of Yūta Hibiki with his memories sealed in the process while his subconscious resides in the pawnshop's PC Junk. The subconscious reminds Yūta of his mission, explaining they need to merge in order for Gridman to battle the Kaiju attacking the city. While Yūta and the Neon Genesis Junior High Students were the only ones that could interact with Gridman, Rikka and Utsumi are able to perceive him after witnessing his first fight and Calibur upgrading Junk.
 Became of his fragmented state, Gridman was forced to wear limiter armor that initially in his purple-colored  before it is optimized into the reddened  by Junk's upgrade. As the Neon Genesis Junior High are embodiments of the other fragments of his being, Gridman can use their Assist Weapons form for additional strength in combat.
: A formation with Battle Tracto Max forms a pair of gigantic forearms and increases his brute strength.
: A formation which occurs when Sky Vitter forms as Gridman's helmet, waist and leg armor.
: Gridman's ultimate formation attained by combining with the four Assist Weapons at the same time. In this case, both Gridman and the Assist Weapons are deployed in half their usual size to conserve energy, forming a full-sized robot once combined. In this form, Gridman has all the abilities and techniques from his other formations at his disposal.
After the Neon Genesis Students restore the fragments to Gridman, he is able to assume his original form to defeat Alexis and regain his original powers.

An amnesiac young boy who wakes up near Rikka's house who lives alone in his family's apartment since his parents are on a business trip, initially being the only one who can see Gridman and the Kaiju custodians around the city. It would later be revealed that he is actually Gridman possessing the real Yūta, regaining his memories and leaving his host once he became whole and captured Alexis.

The sole female member of Gridman Alliance and Yūta's classmate, who found the amnesiac boy in front of her house. Out of her teammates, she desires a normal life but wishes Yūta to keep fighting as Gridman to save their friends. She also extends that wish towards Akane, even after learning that she was created by Akane and programmed to be her friend.

Yūta's classmate and founder of the Gridman Alliance, specialized in human networking and is a fan of tokusatsu, including the Ultra Series. He also had a crush on Akane before learning the truth about her and their world, going through a bit of an existential crisis over it.

NGJHS
They are later revealed to be embodiments of Gridman's scattered fragments modeled after his memories and became living beings in their own right. This factor plays in their  forms being able to combine with Gridman and increase his power, initially one at a time before their power output is reduced so they can all appear and form Full Powered Gridman. But when Gridman is absent, the Assist Weapons can combine on their own into .

A man who helped the Gridman Alliance to optimize Junk and search for the missing victims of Ghoulghilas' attack. He is named after the Samurai Sword from Superhuman Samurai Syber-Squad. He has four swords stored on his back, one being a katana and two other is a pair of barbed broadswords.
During the formation of Full Power Gridman, the  jettisoned and becomes the formation's breastplate. When the rest of his teammates combine into Powered Zenon, Gridman Calibur turns into , allowing them to execute . Under possession of Gridknight, the Gridman Calibur transforms into  to perform .

A tall man with a mask, his weapon is a pair of gauntlets, transforming into a mace for self-defense purpose. His Assist Weapon form is named after the Tracto combat vehicle and its pilot Tanker from Superhuman Samurai Syber-Squad.

An androgynous boy who is named after the twin-driller tank from Superhuman Samurai Syber-Squad. He has a pair of handheld knives stored under his sleeves.
Despite the existence of his , his teammates proclaimed them as non-functional in combat.

 (Japanese); Chris Burnett (English)
A man with a laid-back attitude who is named after the Vitor fighter jet from Superhuman Samurai Syber-Squad.

Antagonists

A digital immortal who performs  to bring Kaiju to life. Despite being jovial around Akane, Alexis manipulates her since he thrives on others' negative emotions. He gradually reveals his true nature over the course of the series before absorbing a depressed Akane to assume a giant fighting form. But Alexis is defeated when Gridman uses his Grid Fixer Beam to negate his immortality, reduced to a smoking shard which Gridman placed in his custody.

Yūta's classmate who is both the most popular student in class and a Kaiju fan, revealed to be behind the Kaiju attacks on Tsutsujidai with Alexis bringing her sculptures to life so Akane can have them kill people for a sense of control. Akane is later revealed to be from the real world as Alexis brought her into a replica of Tsutsujidai she created for herself to escape from her troubles. But the Gridman Alliance's actions cause Akane to break down, forcing to her to stab Yūta and then fall into a depression as Alexis turned her into a Kaiju and then absorbed her for her negativity. But after being freed, Akane realizes the error of her ways and decides to return to the real world.

Kaiju
Monsters created by Akane and brought to life by Alexis Kerib to act under her bidding, each Kaiju a reflection of Akane's mental state. Despite the Poison Gas Monsters repairing the damages to Tsutsujidai, those killed by the Kaiju are mostly forgotten. When Akane fell into a depression following her stabbing Yūta, Alexis recreates all the Kaiju for a final attack on Tsutsujidai. But Gridknight and the Gridman Alliance destroy the Kaiju army.

A group of dinosaur-like monsters whose appearance is identical to Venora (it can possibly be concluded that these are Venora due to the identical subtitle and appearance) from Gridman the Hyper Agent. They function as the Tsutsujidai's maintenance system by repairing all the damages done by Akane's Kaiju and unleashing sleeping gas across the city to conceal the city's true nature by altering the residents' memories. Their existence were hidden from the townspeople, except to Gridman Alliance and the Neon Genesis Junior High Students. While Anonymous was deployed, it decapitated all Poison Gas Monsters during its rampaging spree.

Created by Akane to exact revenge on Tonkawa for ruining her Special Dog with her volleyball, this dragon-like Kaiju monster killed her and some of their classmates while on a rampaging spree until it was killed by Gridman.

At some point of time, Akane recreated Ghoulgilas as a cyborg to interfere with the school festival as means of declaring war with the Gridman Alliance. With no other options left, Yuta proposes the plan on using a half-sized Gridman to scare the participants in the festival as Ghoulgilas rampages, allowing the battle to continue with little casualties. The rest of the Assist Weapons appear and combine with him to form Full Power Gridman and slay Ghoulgilas with Grid Full Power Finish.

Created to murder Akane's homeroom teacher for bumping into her without apologizing, this cybernetic monster is armed with a chest laser and the ability to reflect Gridman's Grid Beam. With Gridman's transformation time almost hit its limit, Samurai transforms into Gridman Calibur to aid the former and slices Dévadadan with Grid Calibur End, saving the teacher.

Created to attack the members of Arcadia after their date interrupted Akane's attempts in gathering information regarding Gridman from Rikka, Gonglee is an unspecified ambushed and killed three members with its smog, shrouding its presence from Gridman until the next day when it goes after Yamato. During their fight, Anti interfered and fought the monster over Gridman before Max Gridman defeated it, as his rival reverted to his human form due to the time limit.

A gigantic mountainous monster that Akane created to kill Gridman and his human associates during their class field trip. Having disguised itself as the mountains, Go'yavec terrorizes the countryside until Buster Gridman destroyed it with Twin Buster Grid Beam.

Created by Anti as means of draw out Gridman and fight him, Diriver is a Pteranodon-like monster operates a flying miniature UFO and use it to attack Gridman before Sky Vitter joins in to form Sky Gridman. As both Diriver and Anti went against their target, Gridman separated from Sky Vitter to slice the monster into half.

An illusory cybernetic dragon monster used to trap the members of Gridman Alliance within a dream, each having befriended Akane. While Bujack influences on its victims, it was rendered intangible in real life until Gridman intruded through Grid Kinesis, ripping Bujack's wings to make it tangible and go on a rampage. The Neon Genesis Junior High Students then combine their Assist Weapon forms into Powered Zenon to quickly finish the monster off.

 Akane's final monster which she made at Alexis's urging, seemingly defeated by Full Powered Gridman. But Anonymous later sheds its skin to revealed a sinister embodiment of Akane's twisted will which slaughters the Poison Gas Monsters and defeats Full Powered Gridman. Anonymous nearly strangles Gridman to death when Anti intervenes with his new resolve to protect Gridman evolving him into Gridknight. With his new form, Anti reads through the monster's movements and destroy it.

A gigantic ammonite-resembling monster that Alexis created from Akane using his Instance Abreaction on her, rampaging through the city before Gridknight appears and pulls out Akane from it before Alexis absorbed her. With no host, Zegga was left as an empty husk that rolled in Tsutsujidai before Gridman wiped it from existence with his Grid Fixer Beam.

Tsutsujidai High School
 and 

Rikka's circle of friends. Namiko has the tendency to tease Yūta and Rikka together, while Hass is frequently seen with a flu mask and is also a YouTuber by the name .

The Tsutsujidai High School volleyball team led by Sakiru. After she accidentally ruined Akane's Special Dog that was meant for Yuta, the monster Ghoulghilas killed Sakiru and the entire team. Following its destruction by Gridman, the damage was reversed but their deaths were covered up as having happened in an "accident" during their middle school years.
Sakiru's father operates a Chinese family restaurant named .
 and 

Akane's circle of friends.

Other characters

Rikka's mother, who runs a junk shop.

A reptilian Kaiju able to convert the noises it absorbs into music, whom Gridman saved while it was corrupted during the events of Gridman the Hyper Agent. It was last seen observing Anosillus the 2nd nursing Anti to health.

SSSS.Dynazenon

Gauma Team

A mysterious man who befriended Yomogi after the latter offered him food. Gauma is a  whose power to manipulate monsters diminished, forcing him to instead pilot the titular mecha, Dynazenon. Gauma is later revealed to be a former member of the Kaiju Eugenicists in their previous incarnation from five millennia prior, who died fighting against the others when they betrayed the princess they were sworn to protect. His mummified remains were uncovered during the events of Gridman the Hyper Agent, where he indirectly provided Gridman with the Assist Weapon Dyna Dragon. Because his link to the Kaiju was severed, Gauma is gradually dying and hides this fact from his teammates, eventually passing away after Gagula is destroyed.
Gauma pilots the  submarine component from Dynazenon.

The main viewpoint character of SSSS.Dynazenon. A high school student in his first year who took on a part-time job at a convenience store to cope with his parents' divorce and his mother getting a boyfriend. He befriended Gauma after offering him food and was dragged into co-piloting Dynazenon due to being nearby when Shalbandes attacked. Out of the four pilots, Yomogi's work schedule prohibited him from spending more time in training for his piloting skills.
Yomogi pilots the  robot component of Dynazenon.
In an original storyline written by Akira Amemiya for the SSSS.DYNAZENON SHOW, a live event held on October 17, 2021, Yomogi marries Yume ten years after the events of the series.

One of Yomogi's classmates; a girl with a reputation for cheating boys by always standing them up for "dates". She was forced by Gauma into co-piloting Dynazenon after she makes Yomogi her most recent victim. Many of her unusual traits are implied to be the result of her poor relationship with her late sister, who was found dead before the events of the story, and she spends much of her time investigating that incident.
Yume pilots the  stealth aircraft component of Dynazenon.
In an original storyline written by Akira Amemiya for the SSSS.DYNAZENON SHOW, a live event held on October 17, 2021, Yume marries Yomogi ten years after the events of the series.

A 33 year old NEET who lives with his mother, who was forced by Gauma into co-piloting Dynazenon after Chise asked him to accompany her when the Kaiju Shalbandes attacked. He is highly troubled by an incident from his school years where a classmate asked him to run away with her after finding a large amount of money hidden in a nearby building, only for him to turn her down. When she turns out to be Yomogi's supervisor and recently married, he becomes deeply tormented by his past.

Koyomi's cousin, who addresses the former as her senior. Although not a pilot of Dynazenon, Chise often hangs out with them due to Koyomi's participation, and had once substituted for Yomogi in Dynasoldier after he fell ill. Her deep frustrations regarding school and feeling excluded by the Dynazenon pilots manifest the Kaijuu Goldburn from its seed.

A Kaiju-fighting robot summoned by Gauma through the use of a dragon ornament given to him by the princess five thousand years ago, after his ability to control Kaiju diminished. As it requires four pilots to operate, Gauma was forced to include Yomogi, Yume and Koyomi as his co-pilots. Able to separate into three vehicles and a smaller dinosaur-like robot, Dynazenon's components can form several additional combinations:
, an alternate combination of all its pieces with a more dragon-like appearance.
, formed with Dynasoldier and Dynawing.
, formed with Dynasoldier and Dynadiver.
, formed with Dynasoldier and Dynastriker.

Chise's personal Kaiju, named after an in-universe rock band and has the ability to change size. It was originally a baroque pearl that Chise picked up after Shalbandes's destruction, which slowly transformed into a golden-armored dragon over time. Unlike the stray Kaiju manipulated by the Eugenicists, Goldburn is loyal to Chise and serves a pivotal role in merging Dynazenon and Gridknight into Kaiser Gridknight.

Kaiju Eugenicists
The  are a quartet of youths that serve as the series's antagonists. Five thousand years prior, they were betrayed and killed by Gauma when he sided against them after they attempted a coup against their nation. Having been resurrected in the present day by their link to Kaiju, they use their  ability to take control of Kaiju in the name of destroying humanity. After the death of Garnix and the discovery that no new Kaiju will ever be born again, the Kaiju Eugenicists disband and go their separate ways. In the last episode, however, they choose to be absorbed into Gagula to increase his power for his battle with Kaizer Gridknight, existing within it in a very similar way to how the pilots appear within Dynazenon. They are apparently killed after the death of Gagula, though Shimizu is seen afterwards in an indeterminate space.

The perceptive member of the group. Juuga bears little resentment towards Gauma despite admitting that he felt betrayed regardless as he profoundly respects Gauma. He expresses an interest in Dynazenon and assumes its co-pilots must be Kaiju Users as well.

The short-tempered member with a personal vendetta against Gauma for defecting from their group and using Dynazenon to fight against monsters. He holds a deep hatred for mankind and wants to kill as many people as possible. A running gag is that when Dynazenon destroys a monster, Onija is usually struck by falling debris and nearly killed.

The only female member of the group. Early on, she appears to have little motivation and to simply go along with what the others desire, but halfway through the series she grows closer to Onija and becomes far more aggressive. 

The youngest member and de facto leader of the group after Gauma's defection. Sizumu transfers into Yomogi's and Yume's class in an attempt to understand their emotions and to explain his own motivations to them. He is said to be able to hear the voices of the Kaiju, and strongly believes that humans lose their freedom when they develop bonds with one another. After the defeat of Garnix he reveals that the Kaiju  lives within him, and uses Instance Domination to assume a massive combined form that absorbs the other Eugenicists and battles Kaiser Gridknight in the last fight of the series. Even after their apparent death, he appears to have one last conversation with Yomogi in an alternative space, where he questions why Yomogi chose to give up the total freedom offered by the power of Kaiju to ignore reality and common sense.

Fujiyokidai High School

Yume's sole friend in school.

Yomogi's circle of friends in his class.

Other characters

Yomogi's co-worker in his part-time job. Inamoto-san was once Koyomi's crush during their school years, until an incident involving her led him to become a shut-in that he is today.

Yume's sister, she died during the former's childhood.

Kaiju
In SSSS.DYNAZENON, the Kaiju are monsters naturally appearing due to human emotions, Sizumu describing them as embodiments of humanity's disillusionment with being restrained by emotional bonds. The Kaiju Eugenicists sought to control them and wipe mankind out. Upon being controlled by a Kaiju User's Instance Domination, they grew into red-eyed behemoths that towered over the cityscape, though Zaiohn grew massive without any outside influence.

The first monster to appear, controlled by the Kaiju Eugenicists off-screen. After failing to tame the monster with his own power, Gauma was forced to summon Dynazenon for the first time. He eventually defeats it with Dynarex formation.

A monster that was originally shorter and docile, until being manipulated by Juuga. Yomogi and Yume drag the monster into the air with Dyna Wing Combine so that Gauma can bombard it with Dynadiver's missiles.

A monster that was manipulated by Onija, possessing the ability to generate large amounts of explosions. The Dynazenon team defeats it by taking it into space, where its explosives fail to detonate.

Manipulated by Mujina, it is a monster with the ability to temporarily transform three-dimensional objects into two-dimensional ones. It was destroyed by Dynarex's Rex Roar.

A jellyfish-like monster with a hidden secondary mouth. It was manipulated by Sizumu from the water park and was destroyed by Dynarex.

A winged four-legged monster manipulated by the combined powers of Onija and Mujina. Although it came close to destroying Dynarex, Gridknight's appearance forced the Eugenicists to transport the monster elsewhere. During Bullbind's second rampage, it was killed by the combined force of Dynazenon and Gridknight.

Originally a small monster which the Gauma Team discovered after it was abandoned by the Kaiju Eugenicists. The monster grew into a towering giant on its own and rampaged across the city, forcing Gridknight to destroy it using the Dynasoldier's Dynamic Cannon form.

A monster that Juuga manipulated in the light of Yume's personal issues. It was defeated by the newly formed Kaiser Gridknight.

The last stray monster to appear, it possessed a strange ability that trapped its victims in their own pasts, causing them to instantly vanish. It immediately caused the disappearance of the Kaiju Eugenicists when they attempted to control it, then caused the entire city to vanish bit by bit. With most of the pilots already taken by its effect, Yomogi was forced to travel through the space within it and bring the others back into the present so that they could fight. After rescuing his teammates and Knight, they formed Kaiser Gridknight and destroyed the monster.

In both series

Gridknight Alliance
A pair of Kaiju in human form who appeared in SSSS.GRIDMAN, entering the real world to help the Gauma Team. The two return to the Computer World in the series finale, taking Dynazenon and Goldburn with them.

 /  / 

A sentient Kaiju that Akane created to destroy Gridman, able to assume the form of a human middle schooler with a hand buzzsaw as his weapon along with replicating Gridman's powers. While loyal to Akane despite her abusive nature, Anti's obsession to defeat Gridman made him detrimental as to her agenda, resulting with him being scarred by Alexis. After Akane severs her ties to Anti as he learned he became a sentient being, Anti repurposed himself as Gridman's ally while evolving into Gridknight. Anti aids the Gridman Alliance before being stabbed by Alexis while extracting Akane from Zegga, initiating Access Flash before succumbing to his injuries. He was nursed to health by Anosillus the 2nd, with his scarred left eye fully healed.
: The fusion of Gridknight with Dynazenon and Goldburn, taking Dynasoldier's place as the central component while the latter becoming the Dynamic Cannon on his right shoulder. Gridknight can also initiate this fusion even if the Dynazenon pilots are absent, albeit weaker in combat.
: The fusion between Gridknight and Goldburn, the latter acting as his flight pack.
Years after renaming himself, an older Knight returns to assist the Gauma Team in fighting against the Kaiju assaults. Because of his presence on Fujiyokidai, Gridknight is capable of influencing Dynazenon as part of his armaments.
 / 

A mysterious human-like Kaiju who is Anosillus's successor, able to enlarge herself. Sharing her predecessor's gratitude towards Gridman and desire to repay their debt, Anosillus the 2nd reveals to Yūta that the world he inhabited was created by Akane. She returns as an adult to accompany Knight in assisting the Gauma Team in fighting against Kaiju assaults, wielding a twirling baton to fix damages in a similar manner to Unison in Gridman the Hyper Agent.

Notes

References

Lists of anime and manga characters